KSDR (1480 AM, "1480 Talk Radio") is a radio station serving Watertown, South Dakota. The station is owned and operated by Alpha Media after it purchased the stations of Digity, LLC.

The station was assigned the KSDR call letters by the Federal Communications Commission.

References

External links
Watertown Radio

SDR
Talk radio stations in the United States
1961 establishments in South Dakota
Radio stations established in 1961